Alexandru Mihail Crivac (born 6 May 2002) is a Romanian professional footballer who plays as a defensive midfielder for Rapid București.

Club career

Argeș Pitești
He made his Liga I debut for Argeș Pitești against Voluntari on 23 May 2022.

Personal life
Crivac is the son of the former Romanian footballer Iulian Crivac.

References

External links
 
 

2002 births
Living people
Sportspeople from Pitești
Romanian footballers
Association football midfielders
Liga I players
Romania youth international footballers
FC Rapid București players
FC Argeș Pitești players